Adi Kesava Perumal temple may refer to several places:
Adikesava Perumal Temple, Kanyakumari, a temple in Kanyakumari, Tamil Nadu, India
Adikesava Perumal temple, Mylapore, a temple in Chennai, Tamil Nadu, India